Get the Girl is a 2017 American comedy crime thriller film directed by Eric England.

Plot 

Clarence is an awkward young man who is in love with a bartender named Alex. Despite visiting the bar multiple times, and an awkward encounter, Alex doesn’t really seem to notice him, partly due to preoccupation with her ongoing divorce proceedings. In order to get her attention, Clarence enlists the help of Patrick, a patron of another bar who seems to be able to get any woman he wants. After Patrick beats Clarence at an expensive game of pool, Patrick becomes interested in helping when Clarence offers him bigger money. Clarence appears to be very wealthy – he drives a fancy car and mentions that his last name is Duffield, indicating that Clarence is from a wealthy, well-known family. Patrick agrees to help him win over the girl. His plan is extreme – for $25,000, Patrick and others will kidnap Alex, and Clarence will rescue her. The experience will supposedly make Alex fall in love with Clarence.

After leaving the bar one night and walking through the parking garage, Alex gets a text from her husband saying he will agree to sign the divorce papers. After realizing the papers are not in her bag, Clarence nearly runs over her while backing out of his parking space. Just then, a black van pulls up. A group of people in masks, one of them Patrick, abducts Clarence and Alex.

The kidnappers go to Clarence’s residence, a large mansion. An alarm is set off when the kidnappers enter, but Clarence disarms it. Jade, Patrick’s girlfriend, and another kidnapper take Alex upstairs. While alone briefly, Clarence asks Patrick why he’s using a device to disguise his voice. Patrick says it’s for anonymity.

While Jade and another kidnapper are distracted, Alex runs and tries to escape. While trying to recapture her, one of the kidnappers is killed by Alex with a pair of scissors. After Alex is recaptured, Clarence and Patrick renegotiate, and Patrick raises his price to $75,000. Alex escapes from her room a second time and tries to climb down one of balconies of the mansion. She is startled by one of the kidnappers, falls to the ground, and is knocked out.

While the kidnapper takes Alex back inside the house, a police officer shows up at the mansion; the security company called about the alarm, but no one answered. Clarence, Patrick, Jade, and KJ try to play it cool with the police officer. At the same time, the kidnapper watching Alex (who has woken up) accidentally reveals his real name, Carl, to her. An argument ensues and Carl yells and becomes violent. Alex screams. The officer hears the commotion, but Patrick quickly pulls his gun on the officer. Clarence runs back inside and finds Carl smothering Alex. Outside, Patrick shoots and kills the officer. Inside the house, Clarence shoots and kills Carl. Alex is relieved that Clarence has saved her life, but Patrick comes in, beats up Clarence, and drags him downstairs. They argue, and Patrick shoots Clarence in the arm and raises his price to $100,000.

Patrick orders KJ, one of the kidnappers, to start cleaning up the around the house and move the bodies to the van. In order to calm Jade, who is disturbed by all the violence, Patrick gives her an engagement ring. Jade’s fear turns to happiness. KJ finds an AR-15 rifle in the trunk of the police car.

Tired and frustrated, Patrick demands the money. Clarence takes Patrick back behind the mansion where he shows him a locked briefcase at the bottom of the pool. When Clarence admits the briefcase has been there all night, Patrick realizes that there is only $25,000 in it. He pushes Clarence into the pool to retrieve the briefcase. At the same time, KJ goes to the kitchen to look for cleaning products, but finds all the drawers and cabinets empty. He goes to the garage and finds a Toyota car, and inside, a rental ad for the mansion and an insurance document listing Clarence’s last name as “Clark,” not “Duffield.” 
	
Upstairs, Alex recognizes Jade’s engagement ring. Outside, Clarence gets the briefcase but pulls Patrick into the pool as he is getting out and runs around towards the front of the house. KJ comes out to the back yard and informs Patrick that Clarence isn’t who he says he is. Patrick instructs KJ to go to the front of the house to find Clarence.

Patrick goes back inside the house with the briefcase, without his mask on, and is confronted by Jade and Alex. Patrick is Alex’s husband; Alex realized that he was one of the kidnappers when she saw Jade’s ring, which is actually Alex’s wedding ring. KJ radios Patrick that the tires on their van have been slashed (Clarence slashed them). Patrick shoots and kills Jade, and Alex runs into the backyard. KJ tries to shoot her but misses. He goes back inside as Clarence, off screen, calls the police and cuts the power to the house. Patrick and Alex fight at the front of the house and Alex is shot in the leg. She runs back inside the house. KJ and Clarence find each other in the kitchen and struggle, but Clarence gets away, taking a knife with him. Clarence and Alex then find each other and kiss passionately. After he and Alex hide briefly, Clarence pushes KJ down a flight of stairs. KJ accidentally shoots and kills himself with the AR-15.

Now downstairs, Clarence takes the AR-15 from KJ, and Alex takes KJ’s handgun. Patrick finds them and a brief gunfight ensues. The AR-15 finally runs out of bullets, and the three of them are in a standoff: Patrick, holding a gun and the briefcase, Alex, holding a gun, and Clarence, holding only a knife. Patrick has realized not only that Clarence lied about who he is, but that he actually knew who Patrick was the entire time. Clarence reveals that he saw Patrick and Alex when they were happily married and saw their marriage crumble. He also figured out why Patrick would not divorce Alex – he wanted the money Alex inherited from her grandmother. Clarence knew that Patrick would jump at an opportunity to kill Alex and get her inheritance. Just as Patrick is about to shoot Alex, Alex shoots him. Patrick drops his gun. Clarence tells him to open the briefcase. Inside is not money, but Alex’s divorce papers. Clarence gives Patrick two choices: sign the divorce papers, or Alex will decide what happens to him. Patrick signs them.

Patrick walks out the front door as police start to arrive. Alex is both stunned and puzzled, as Clarence doesn’t really even know her, but Clarence tells her that he loves her. He explains that after her marriage went bad, he saw her guarding herself from ever being loved again. “So you almost killed me to show me that I’m alive?” she asks. Clarence responds, somewhat embarrassed “Yeah, something like that.” With the police outside Clarence gives Alex two options: shoot him, since he deserves it for everything that he put her through, or, let the police arrest him. But he tells her to promise him that she is going to live her life knowing that she deserves to be happy. Alex replies neither of those options are positive for him, but Clarence doesn’t feel he deserves a positive option. Alex then asks what option three would be; to her there must be an option three. Clarence replies “Well, if there’s an option three, I guess it’d have to be…” as the screen goes to black.

Cast
Justin Dobies as Clarence
Elizabeth Whitson as Alex
Noah Segan as Patrick
Adi Shankar as KJ
Daniel Quinn as Officer Talley
Scout Taylor-Compton as Jade
James Landry Hébert as Carl
Jerry Purpdrank as Embry

Reception
The film has a 13% rating on Rotten Tomatoes.  Brian Tallerico of RogerEbert.com gave the film two stars.

References

External links
 
 

2017 films
2017 black comedy films
2017 crime thriller films
2010s comedy thriller films
2010s crime comedy films
American black comedy films
American comedy thriller films
American crime comedy films
American crime thriller films
Films about kidnapping in the United States
Films directed by Eric England
Orion Pictures films
Vertical Entertainment films
2010s English-language films
2010s American films